Henry Gates may refer to:

 Henry Louis Gates Jr. (born 1950), American literary critic
 Henry Gates (MP) (1515–1589), Member of Parliament (MP) for Yorkshire
 Henry Gates (Nova Scotia politician) (1790–1847), Methodist blacksmith and politician